Mamadi Souaré (born 10 January 1971), sometimes known as Passarella, is a Guinean professional football manager and former player who played as a right-back. As a player, he represented the Guinea national team, and he managed them from 2009 to 2010.

Managerial career
Souaré briefly managed the Guinea national football team for 8 months from 2009 to 2010. In 2015, he was appointed manager at SAG Siguiri, and he moved to Gangan in 2017.

References

External links
 Profile

1971 births
Living people
People from Faranah Region
Guinean footballers
Guinea international footballers
Guinean football managers
Guinea national football team managers
Guinée Championnat National players
Association football midfielders